The New York City landmark bomb plot was a plan to follow up the February 1993 World Trade Center bombing and was designed to inflict mass casualties on American soil by attacking well-known landmark targets throughout New York City, United States. If the attack had been successful, thousands likely would have died.

Before and after the World Trade Center bombing, the Federal Bureau of Investigation had a confidential informant, Emad Salem, infiltrate the group of plotters. FBI officers arrested the main suspects in June 1993 before the plot could be carried out. In 1995, ten defendants were convicted of 48 charges related to the plot.

Attackers
The plot was espoused by a blind sheikh, Omar Abdel-Rahman, who was a radical Muslim cleric in New York City, to be carried out by some of his followers. Rahman was the spiritual leader of the al-Gama'a al-Islamiyya, a radical Egyptian Islamic group that had links to al-Qaeda. One of Rahman's followers, El Sayyid Nosair, had assassinated Meir Kahane in 1990 and was linked to the 1993 World Trade Center bombing.

Targets
The six targets to be attacked were the UN headquarters, the Lincoln Tunnel, the Holland Tunnel, the George Washington Bridge, the St. Regis and the UN Plaza Hotels, and the FBI's main New York office at the Jacob K. Javits Federal Building. There was also some talk of bombing Jewish targets in the city They  also wanted to assassinate US Senator Al D'Amato and Egyptian President Hosni Mubarak.

Nosair also wanted to assassinate New York State Assemblyman Dov Hikind, a Jewish politician, and Alvin Schlesinger, a judge who had tried him in a previous case.

The attack on the hotels would be detrimental because they are known to host prestigious guests such as the US ambassador to the United Nations and the US secretary of state, who stayed at the Waldorf during UN sessions. The hotels are also known to host several prominent business leaders. Attacking the locations would thus create chaos in the financial and diplomatic aspects of New York.

The planned attacks on the Holland and Lincoln Tunnels and the George Washington Bridge would create chaos in transportation between New Jersey and Manhattan, as these were the only three direct vehicular crossings between the two locations. If the attacks were successful, police, civilians, and other respondents would have major issues entering and leaving the city. Co-conspirators indicated that they intended to drive bomb-laden cars into the tunnels, stall the cars in the middle, and detonate them three minutes after leaving the cars.

The attackers also discussed attacks on the Diamond District in Manhattan, an area populated by a large population of Jewish businessmen. It was stated that attacking the neighborhood would be similar to "hitting Israel itself." Simultaneous attacks in the same city were carried out as well during the 2008 Mumbai attacks.

The New York group had supposedly wanted to plant a total of 12 bombs around the city targeting Jews and then detonate them at the same time.

Plan 
The terrorists suspected President Mubarak to be present in the hotels and intended to infiltrate the hotels by using disguises as employees to get close to him. The other attacks in the city were used as distractions and to inflict chaos throughout the city. Bombs would be used on the bridges while the other terrorists would raid the hotels with guns. Even if it was not there, the attacks throughout the city would have caused a large number of deaths.

FBI surveillance 
The FBI had been closely monitoring the plan throughout 1992 and 1993 but intensified its investigation after the World Trade Center bombing in February 1993, which killed six people.

Emad Salem was used as an intelligence asset during the entire investigation (codenamed TERRSTOP) into the plot and for one year earlier. He had experienced a man being tortured when he was young and so Salem wanted revenge on radical Islam. FBI agents first used him to find the illegal selling of weapons and green cards from Russians and then Salem agreed to help the FBI during the plot. He was recruited to get information of the terrorists the details of the plan. Salem agreed to spy for the FBI if his identity was never revealed. The FBI insisted that he should wear a recording device so that he could testify in later trials, but he did not agree to that. The FBI then used him only as an "intelligence asset." Around May 7, 1993, Salem started meeting regularly with the defendants.

The FBI had also been monitoring the terrorists through video surveillance hidden in the terrorists' safe house, where bombs were being developed. Combined, the video surveillance and the use of an inside man greatly contributed into foiling the plot. In the final weeks of the investigation, the FBI monitored the plot almost constantly. At one point, when Senator D'Amato and Assemblyman Hikind received bodyguards, agents mistakenly feared that their investigation had been exposed.

Salem infiltrated the group and gathered information that led to the arrest of the plotters. The FBI took two years to investigate the plot, which showed that a slow approach to terrorist investigations was beneficial. James Kallstrom, an ex-FBI officer, said, "You obviously want to play things out so you can fully identify the breadth and scope of the conspiracy. Obviously, the most efficient and effective way to do that is to bring it down to the last stage." That was the precedent for many later terrorist cases. The general public later criticized that strategy, but the FBI still leans toward slow approaches to foil terrorist plots.

Prosecution and aftermath
Eight conspirators were arrested in a raid on June 24, 1993, after Salem had observed the group for five months. The conspirators were mixing chemicals for the bombs when they were arrested. It was revealed that the conspirators had also conducted test bombings before the World Trade Center bombing. They had also made preparations to escape quickly, which led the FBI to conclude that the suspects needed to be arrested quickly. A ninth suspect was arrested on June 30. The government announced the indictment of a tenth suspect on July 8. After the arrests were made, the Port Authority of New York and New Jersey increased security on its six river crossings between New York and New Jersey. The three crossings in the bombing plot had been under the Port Authority's purview.

William Kunstler agreed to represent three of the suspects, including Rahman and Nosair. However, Federal Judge Michael Mukasey later ruled that Rahman and the two other suspects would have to be represented separately and that Kunstler and Ronald L. Kuby would have to choose which defendants to represent. Rahman later offered to represent himself after the two lawyers could not agree on who would represent him. A bail hearing for one of the suspects, Clement Rodney Hampton-El, was held at the United States District Court for the Southern District of New York on July 8. The court found that Salem's tapes supported only some of the charges against Hampton-El. The federal government wanted to try the suspects in New York because of the severity of the charges. Complicating matters, some of the suspects were also being arraigned on drug charges. A week and a half later, the US government announced that evidence was found that Sudan had been giving help to Rahman and the other plotters. Sudanese diplomats had assisted the planned attack on the United Nations headquarters. Consequently, the US government placed Sudan on a watch list of terrorist countries.

On August 25, 1993, Attorney General Janet Reno announced that she would prosecute the bombing case because of more evidence. That was a reversal from her position two months earlier, when she had said that there was insufficient evidence for prosecution. The same day, Rahman was formally indicted in connection with three crimes: the landmark bombing plot, the World Trade Center bombing, and the 1990 assassination of Meir Kahane. The case against the defendants was prosecuted by lead prosecutor Andrew C. McCarthy. One of the defendants, Siddig Ibrahim Siddig Ali, allowed prosecutors to view his notes.

Salem ultimately testified against Rahman and other terrorists despite earlier refusing to do so. Salem had recorded tapes in which the defendants sought to prevent Rahman from being directly involved in the terror plot so that he would not be implicated. The defense lawyers unsuccessfully attempted to have all 13 defendants tried separately. New defense counsel were hired, and in September 1994, Judge Mukasey postponed the trial's opening date to December so that defense counsel could come up with new arguments. In November 1994, Mukasey rescheduled the date to January 1995 because Rahman had contracted pneumonia.

In February 1995, Siddig Ali pled guilty to the terror plot and also named some of the co-defendants as complicit in the plot.

Once the trial started, Salem testified about the details of the bomb plot. Defense lawyers cross-examining Salem argued that he was not credible because he had lied several times in the past, including when he was gaining his US citizenship. However, Salem testified that the defendants had confided the details of the plot to him. In May 1995, one of the defendants, Abdo Mohammed Haggag, agreed to testify against the other 11 defendants in exchange for all his charges being dropped.

Convictions
On October 1, 1995, Rahman and nine others were convicted by a New York jury on 48 of 50 charges, including seditious conspiracy, solicitation to murder Mubarak, conspiracy to murder Mubarak, solicitation to attack a US military installation, and conspiracy to conduct bombings. In January 1996, Mukasey sentenced Rahman and nine other defendants to terms that ranged from 25 years to life in prison. After the trial, Salem received a large sum of money and was put onto a witness protection program.

See also
2009 Bronx terrorism plot
November 2008 Mumbai attacks - Mumbai attacks were primilarly based upon the New York City landmark bomb plot
Bojinka plot

References

Terrorist incidents in the United States in 1993
Explosions in 1993
Failed terrorist attempts in New York City
Islamic terrorism in New York (state)
1993 in New York City